Delta Tucanae (δ Tuc, δ Tucanae) is a common proper motion  pair located in the southwestern corner of the southern constellation of Tucana. Based upon an annual parallax shift of 13.00 mas as seen from Earth, is approximately 250 light years from the Sun. It is visible to the naked eye with a combined apparent visual magnitude of +4.48. As of 2013, the two components had an angular separation of 7.0 arc seconds along a position angle of 282°.

The brighter primary, component A, is blue-white hued star a visual magnitude of 4.52. It is a B-type main-sequence star with a stellar classification of B9 Vn, where the 'n' suffix indicates "nebulous" absorption lines due to the star's rotation. It is spinning rapidly with a projected rotational velocity of 224 km/s, which is giving the star an oblate shape with an equatorial bulge that is an estimated 12% larger than the polar radius. The star has about three times the mass of the Sun and is around 232 million years old.

The magnitude 8.85 companion, component B, is a G-type main-sequence star.

References

B-type main-sequence stars
G-type main-sequence stars
Binary stars
Tucanae, Delta
Tucana (constellation)
Durchmusterung objects
212581
110838
8540